The 1903 Livingstone football team represented Livingstone College in the 1903 college football season as an independent. Results may be incomplete, but Livingstone played in at least three games, winning each. An article by The Charlotte Observer stated that "Livingstone has defeated all comers this year, and claims the championship of the colored colleges of the state."

Schedule

References

Livingstone
Livingstone Blue Bears football seasons
Livingstone football
College football undefeated seasons